Arpakesmez is a village in the Kilis District, Kilis Province, Turkey. The village is inhabited by Turkmens of the Elbegli tribe and had a population of 103 in 2022.

References

Villages in Kilis District